FC Honka is a Finnish football club based in Espoo. It was founded in 1957 as Tapion Honka, and changed its name to FC Honka in 1975. The club currently play in the Finnish premier division (Veikkausliiga), having been promoted for the first time in their history at the end of the 2005 season. It plays its home matches at the Tapiolan Urheilupuisto.

FC Honka is largely renowned in Finland for its extensive youth scheme with over 1,000 youth players playing in various age groups. It also has a women's team in the Kansallinen Liiga.

History
Until 2005 FC Honka was thought of as a "nearly, but not quite" team, a promising but always underachieving side in the Finnish First Division (Ykkönen). In the late 1990s the objective was promotion, but year after year they failed. At the beginning of the 21st century FC Honka almost went bankrupt but was saved at the last moment.
In early 2005 the club was taken over by Jouko Pakarinen and Jouko Harjunpää, who had a plan to turn FC Honka from underachievers to a UEFA Champions League candidate.

In the first year of their take-over of FC Honka, the new management succeeded in assembling a squad which won the First Division (Ykkönen) with ease and also made the semi-finals of the Finnish Cup where they eventually lost 1–0 to FC Haka.

FC Honka was able to fight for top positions instantly, but narrowly missed the top three in their first two seasons. In 2007 the team reached the Finnish Cup final, losing to Tampere United on penalties after extra time. As Tampere United also won the league title that season, FC Honka qualified for the 2008–09 UEFA Cup. In 2008, FC Honka achieved its highest place by finishing 2nd in the league.

FC Honka won the Finnish Cup in 2012. However, due to financial difficulties the team was relegated to the third tier Kakkonen in 2015. In 2015 the fitness center company Esport bought the club and after that, the club has also been known as Esport Honka. The club dominated their first season in the Kakkonen in 2015 and lost only two games, but were defeated in the promotion battle. After the 2016 season, the team was promoted to the second tier Finnish First Division (Ykkönen). After the 2017 Ykkönen season Honka was promoted to the highest Finnish tier (Veikkausliiga) after Promotion playoffs against HIFK.

Honours

League
Veikkausliiga
Runners-up (3): 2008, 2009, 2013

Ykkönen
Champions: 2005

Cups
Finnish Cup
Winners: 2012
Runners-up (3): 1969, 2007, 2008

Finnish League Cup
Winners (3): 2010, 2011, 2022

Friendly
La Manga Cup
Winners: 2009

European competitions

As runners-up in the 2007 Finnish Cup to Tampere United, who had also won the league title, FC Honka qualified for the 2008–09 UEFA Cup, beating the Icelandic club ÍA 4–2 in the 1st qualifying round and the Norwegian club Viking in the 2nd. In the first round of actual competition, they were drawn against Racing Santander and lost 0–2 on aggregate.

Next year, Honka qualified for the new UEFA Europa League, starting from the second qualifying round. The club beat Welsh side Bangor City F.C. 3–0 on aggregate but lost 1–3 to FK Karabakh from Azerbaijan in the third qualifying round.

For the 2010–11 season, FC Honka was again drawn against Bangor City in the second round but lost 3–2 on aggregate.

During the winter of 2009, Honka won the annual La Manga Cup, beating FC Nordsjælland in the final.

European cups record

Matches

UEFA club ranking
This is the UEFA Club Ranking , including season 2013–14.

Last update: 22 June 2021

Season to season

Current squad
.

Management
Updated 19 February 2021.

FC Honka Akatemia 

FC Honka Akatemia is the reserve team of FC Honka. The team plays in Kakkonen in 2022 season.

Managers
 Jari Europaeus (1 Jan 2001 – 31 Dec 2003)
 Abdou "Dalla" Talat (1 Jan 2004 – 31 Dec 2004)
 Mika Lehkosuo (1 Jan 2005 – 7 Feb 2014)
 Shefki Kuqi (15 Feb 2014 – 31 Dec 2014)
 Juho Rantala (7 Feb 2015 – 1 Dec 2016)
 Vesa Vasara (5 Dec 2016 – present)

See also 
FC Honka (women)

Footnotes

References

External links

Official Website 
Honka Supporters 

 
Honka
Sport in Espoo
Association football clubs established in 1957
1957 establishments in Finland